Dequey is one of the Batanes Islands, in the province of Batanes, in Luzon Strait, the Philippines. The island is a very small and a rather low piece of land, lying nearly 1/2 mile westward of the northwest point of Ivuhos Island.  Dequey Island is uninhabited.

An unnamed active submarine volcano rising to within  of the sea surface is located  due west of Dequey Island.

See also

 List of active volcanoes in the Philippines
 List of inactive volcanoes in the Philippines
 List of potentially active volcanoes in the Philippines
 Pacific ring of fire
 Islands of the Philippines
 List of islands
 Desert island

References

Islands of Batanes
Uninhabited islands of the Philippines